Ari Hoptman (born February 22, 1967) is an American actor, author, and academic, specializing in Germanic etymology, as well as a Marx Brothers historian.

Career
Hoptman attended Wayne State University before moving to the Twin Cities to attend graduate school at the University of Minnesota. He studied Germanic philology under Anatoly Liberman, eventually earning his doctoral degree in 2002. His graduate work investigated the possible relationship between Verner's Law and certain stress patterns of Old Germanic poetry.

At the University of Minnesota, Hoptman teaches classes in the Department of German, Nordic, Scandinavian & Dutch.

Hoptman has appeared in dozens of theatre productions, plays and solo shows, mostly in comedic roles. Minnesota Public Radio called Hoptman a "great local actor", and one reviewer said he takes a dry pleasure in unusual couplings in his humor.

Portraying Ira Stone from Laughter on the 23rd Floor four different times, Hoptman has described the journalist as obnoxious, loud, rude, and late on arrival, but "a brilliant writer."

Filmography

Publications
Hoptman's books include:

 A Bibliography of English Etymology, Volumes 1–2 with Anatoly Liberman and Nathan E. Carlson 
 Die erste Reise 
 Sprachbau: Grammatik und Arbeitsheft Fur Das Dritte Jahr 
 The Mood of the Tales are Gloomy 
 Verner's Law, Stress, and the Accentuation of Old Germanic Poetry

Hoptman's work has been used or referrnced in a number of books and journals, including:

 1001 Secrets Every Birder Should Know: Tips and Trivia for the Backyard and Beyond by Sharon Stiteler 
 Amsterdamer Beiträge zur älteren Germanistik, Volumes 54-55  
 An Analytic Dictionary of the English Etymology: An Introduction by Anatoly Liberman 
 Current projects in historical lexicography 
 Interdisciplinary Journal for Germanic Linguistics and Semiotic Analysis, Volume 4 
 Intermediate Dutch: A Grammar and Workbook by Jenneke A. Oosterhoff 
 Linguistics and Language Behavior Abstracts: LLBA., Volume 36, Issue 1 
 North-western European Language Evolution: NOWELE., Volumes 36–37 
 Sociological Abstracts, Volume 50, Issue 2

Hoptman is mentioned for his acting in:

 The Dude Abides: The Gospel According to the Coen Brothers by Cathleen Falsani 
 The Princeton Seventh by James Vculek.

References

Jewish American male actors
University of Minnesota alumni
Wayne State University alumni
Etymologists
American non-fiction writers
Living people
1967 births
21st-century American Jews